Errol Clyde Klotz (born June 8, 1961) is a Canadian television art director and production designer. He worked as an assistant art director on several TV series filmed in Vancouver, such as The Hitchhiker, 21 Jump Street and The X-Files; and as an illustrator on the films This Boy's Life and Look Who's Talking Too.

He subsequently worked as a production designer for Rainmaker Animation on the computer-animated series ReBoot and also on The Transformers spin-off Beast Wars.

Awards and nominations
Klotz was nominated for a Canadian Genie Award in 1996 for Achievement in Art Direction/Production Design on the film Magic in the Water. His work on Beast Wars won him a Daytime Emmy Award for Outstanding Achievement in Animation in 1998.

Personal life
On January 1, 1994, Klotz married actress Gillian Anderson, who played Dana Scully on The X-Files, where they met on the set. They have one daughter. They divorced in 1997.

References

External links

1961 births
Living people
Canadian people of German descent
Canadian art directors
Canadian production designers
Daytime Emmy Award winners
Canadian illustrators